Oscar Segurado is a medical researcher and academician. He holds a tenured professorship of Immunology at the University of León, Spain. Segurado has conducted research in the domains of Rheumatology and Immunology. His scientific work focuses on Rheumatoid arthritis.

Education 
He received his Ph.D. from the University of Wuerzburg, Germany, and his MD from the University of Salamanca, Spain.

Career 
Segurado served as an Associate professor at the Faculties of Medicine in the Ludwig Maximilian University of Munich, Germany, and Complutense University of Madrid, Spain, and was later awarded tenure professorship at University of León. He has published papers focusing on Gene therapy (ASC, AveXis, UCLA Ventures, UniQure, and Symvivo), immuno-oncology (Amgen, AstraZeneca, Bellicum, and Jazz), immuno-therapy (Bristol-Myers Squibb, Macrogenics, and TriSalus), genomics (Freenome, Myriad) and protein/cell diagnostics (Abbott, BD, and Crescendo), predominantly focused on Oncology, Hematology, and Autoimmunity, including personalized medicine, molecular and cellular biomarkers.

Selected Publications

Books
 Mindful Framing:Transform Your Anxiety Into Vital Energy (2018)

References

External links 
 Google Scholar

Living people
American immunologists
1958 births